Greenfield Union School District is a Kindergarten - 8th grade public school district in Bakersfield, California. The district has 12 schools, and serves South Bakersfield.

References

External links
 

School districts in Kern County, California